Demirbaş is a Turkish surname. Notable people with the surname include:

 Abdullah Demirbaş (born 1966), Turkish politician
 Hayrettin Demirbaş (born 1963), Turkish footballer and coach
 Taner Demirbaş (born 1978), Turkish footballer

Turkish-language surnames